Chris Mattos is an American politician who has represented the Chittenden-10 district in the Vermont House of Representatives since 2017.

References

Living people
University of Vermont alumni
21st-century American politicians
Republican Party members of the Vermont House of Representatives
Politicians from Burlington, Vermont
Year of birth missing (living people)